Eva Lasting is a Colombian romantic drama streaming television series created by Dago García. It is produced by Caracol Televisión for Netflix. The series premiered on 15 February 2023.

On 24 February 2023, the series was renewed for a second season.

Cast

Main 
 Emmanuel Restrepo as Camilo Granados
 Francisca Estévez as Eva Samper
 Santiago Alarcón as José Granados
 Verónica Orozco as Ana de Granado
 Sergio Palau as Martin Salcedo
 Brandon Figueredo as Álvaro Castro
 Mateo García as Rodrigo Arbeláez
 Julián Cerati as Gustavo Pabón Linares

Recurring 
 Cecilia Navia as Profesora Estela
 Santiago Heins as Edgar Acuña
 Billy Heins as William Acuña
 John Alex Toro as Henry Pabón
 Mónica Giraldo as Adela
 Angelo Valotta as Quiñones
 Catherine Mira as Brigitte
 Sara Pinzón as Luisa Salcedo
 Cristian Duque as Milton Guzmán
 Ella Becerra as Sara
 Fernando Lara as Miguel Chacón
 Diana Belmonte as Lucrecia Linares de Pabón
 Adriana Arango as Dr. Alicia López

Episodes

References

External links 
 
 

2020s Colombian television series
2023 Colombian television series debuts
Spanish-language Netflix original programming